"Vaga luna, che inargenti" (Beautiful moon, dappling with silver) is an arietta composed by Vincenzo Bellini to an anonymous Italian text and dedicated to Giulietta Pezzi. It was published in 1838 by Casa Ricordi in  along with two other Bellini songs, "" and "". It was also amongst the fifteen Bellini songs published by Ricordi under the title  in 1935, the centenary of the composer's death. Composed in the bel canto style, it is a frequent recital piece, and has often been recorded. Its original key is in A-flat major with a tempo of andante cantabile.

Lyrics

Sources

Paton, John Glenn (2004). Gateway to Italian Songs and Arias: High Voice. Alfred Music Publishing, pp. 130–135.

External links

, Luciano Pavarotti, James Levine, Lincoln Center 1988

Compositions by Vincenzo Bellini
1838 songs
Arias in Italian
Soprano arias